Calotmul is a town and the municipal seat of the Calotmul Municipality, Yucatán in Mexico. As of 2010, the town has a population of 2,764.

Demographics

References 

Populated places in Yucatán
Municipality seats in Yucatán